Acrodipsas myrmecophila, the small ant-blue, is a butterfly of the family Lycaenidae. It is found in the south-east of Australia.

The wingspan is about 25 mm. The larvae feed on the larvae of the ant species Papyrius nitidus. The butterfly features on the logo of the Geelong Field Naturalists Club.

External links
Australian Caterpillars

Acrodipsas
Butterflies of Australia
Butterflies described in 1913